Sophora saxicola is a species of flowering plant in the family Fabaceae, that is endemic to Jamaica.

References

saxicola
Flora of Jamaica
Endangered plants
Endemic flora of Jamaica
Taxonomy articles created by Polbot